M. N. Reddi (born 23 January 1960) is a senior officer in the Indian Police Service and in July 2014 was appointed Commissioner of Police, Bangalore City.  He has long experience in traffic policing, traffic management and road safety. He is Tech savvy police officer. He did his undergraduate studies at Christ College. He has an M.A. and an M.Phil in sociology from Jawaharlal Nehru University, New Delhi, and has graduated  as an officer of the elite Indian Police Service from the National Police Academy.

References 

Indian Police Service officers
Living people
1960 births
 Karnataka Police
Christ University alumni